"Time Has Come Today" is the first episode of the third season of the American television medical drama Grey's Anatomy, and the show's 37th episode overall. Written by Shonda Rhimes and directed by Daniel Minahan, the episode aired on the American Broadcasting Company (ABC) in the United States on September 21, 2006. The episode primarily focuses on Dr. Izzie Stevens (Katherine Heigl) coping with the unexpected death of her fiancé, Denny Duquette (Jeffrey Dean Morgan), while dealing with the decision to quit the internship program. Further storylines include Dr. Preston Burke (Isaiah Washington) facing the repercussions of his being shot, and Dr. Meredith Grey (Ellen Pompeo) dealing with the aftermath of her affair with Dr. Derek Shepherd (Patrick Dempsey), which puts a strain in his already troubled marriage to Dr. Addison Montgomery-Shepherd (Kate Walsh).

Although the episode was fictionally set in Seattle, Washington, filming occurred in Los Angeles, California. The recurring characters of Adele Webber (Loretta Devine), Finn Dandrige (Chris O'Donnell), Dr. Ellis Grey (Kate Burton) and Olivia Harper (Sarah Utterback) were portrayed with guest star billing. The title of the episode refers to the song, "Time Has Come Today", by the soul music band, The Chambers Brothers. The episode received mixed to favorable reviews, with Heigl being particularly praised. The episode was viewed by 25.41 million Americans in the United States upon its original airing, ranked first in weekly viewership and garnered a 9.0 Nielsen rating in the 18–49 demographic.

Plot 
"Time Has Come Today" opens to a voice-over narration from Dr. Meredith Grey (Ellen Pompeo) about the rapid passing of time. Dr. Izzie Stevens (Katherine Heigl) has a mental collapse after the loss of her fiancé, Denny Duquette (Jeffrey Dean Morgan), as she refuses to deal with the repercussions of her decision to leave the internship program, by lying on the bathroom floor. Dr. Cristina Yang (Sandra Oh), Dr. Alex Karev (Justin Chambers) and Dr. George O'Malley (T.R. Knight) support Stevens during her grieving, becoming influential in her recovering. Dr. Addison Montgomery-Shepherd (Kate Walsh) finds Grey's underwear in Dr. Derek Shepherd's (Patrick Dempsey) shirt, and finds difficulty in conceiving a future for their already troubled marriage. Grey unwillingly finds herself in a love triangle involving Shepherd and Finn Dandridge (Chris O'Donnell). Dr. Richard Webber's (James Pickens Jr.) wife, Adele Webber (Loretta Devine), gives him an ultimatum after spending the night in his office, giving him a choice between his career as a surgeon and his marriage to her. Dr. Preston Burke (Isaiah Washington) faces the aftermath of being shot, which leads to him experiencing hand tremors that could lead to his giving up cardiothoracic surgery.

An infant with a severe heart condition is admitted in neonatology, and is revealed to have been abandoned in a schoolyard by his biological mother, whose identity lies between four pre-adolescents. Montgomery quickly becomes emotionally involved in the case, reliving the feelings she went through after aborting the child conceived with Dr. Mark Sloan (Eric Dane). Shepherd and O'Malley get quarantined after an outbreak at the hospital, due to a patient suspected of having the plague. Their incapacity to leave the hospital leads to numerous confessions between the two, including Shepherd's reveal of his desire to divorce his wife and reconcile with Grey. Dr. Callie Torres (Sara Ramirez) takes a leave of absence from the hospital, in a continuous attempt to bond with the grieving interns, who do not approve of her relationship with O'Malley. When a patient, Giselle Toussant (Elizabeth Goldstein), is admitted to the hospital, and ultimately dies in Dr. Miranda Bailey (Chandra Wilson)'s care, she begins to question her abilities as a surgeon, due to the guilt over the death of both Toussant and Duquette, whom she also performed surgery on. At the conclusion of the episode, Stevens overcomes her grief and gets off the floor, which metaphorically expresses her desire to move on.

Production 

The episode was written by show runner and executive producer Shonda Rhimes, while filmmaker Daniel Minahan directed it. Sara Ramirez began receiving star billing in the season premiere, after numerous appearances during the last episodes of the second season. Although the episode was fictionally set in Seattle, Washington, it was filmed in Los Angeles, California. Fisher Plaza, which is the headquarters building for Fisher Communications and Fisher's ABC affiliated Komo radio and television stations for Seattle, is used for some exterior shots of Seattle Grace Mercy West Hospital, such as air ambulances landing on the Komo Television newscopter's helipad. This puts Seattle Grace conveniently close to the Space Needle, which is directly across the street from Fisher Plaza, the Seattle Monorail, and other local landmarks. However, the hospital used for most other exterior and many interior shots is not in Seattle, are shot at the VA Sepulveda Ambulatory Care Center in North Hills, California. Most scenes are primarily filmed in Los Feliz, Los Angeles, at the Prospect Studios, and the set occupies two stages, including the hospital pieces, but some outside scenes are shot at the Warren G. Magnuson Park in Seattle.

Featured music includes The Dixie Chicks' "Lullaby", Tegan and Sara's "Take Me Anywhere", Sleeping at Last's "Quicksand", Emilíana Torrini's "Nothing Brings Me Down", Gnarls Barkley's "Gone Daddy Gone", Grant Lee Phillips's "Under the Milky Way" and Matt Kearney's "All I Need". Rhimes disclosed that the main concept for the episode was to "go in places the audience can imagine, but doesn't expect", in an attempt to "freshen up" the series for the new season. Rhimes stated that she originally planned to move the timeline three months after the conclusion of the second season, but the process did not occur, due to her not wanting the audience to miss significant moments from the character's complex lives. "I feel like so much happened at the end of last season that I owe it to the characters to have them deal with the aftermath. And I owe it to the audience to let them watch the aftermath", stated Rhimes, in response to her decision to continue the storyline from where the previous season left off. Rhimes also described the prominence which Grey's underwear has in the first episode of the season, noting how they are "a key element" in the development of her character: "Meredith never put them back on. She rushed out to deal with Izzie and left Derek who was asking what that meant, and she never had a chance to put those panties back on." Prior to the episode's broadcast, Rhimes described it as achieving a balance between the aftermath of the recent events and the past experiences that define each character. In addition, she noted how the episode marked the transition to a new chapter in the personal backgrounds of the protagonists, stating: "It was mean to bring us to a place where we can say goodbye to Denny, as well as deal with Meredith's love triangle. Just remember that nothing is ever wrapped up easily on this show. Because things aren't neat and clean in real life."

Reception 

The episode was originally broadcast on September 21, 2006 at 9:00 ET, and averaged 25.41 million viewers, ranking first in weekly viewership with a 9.0 rating, according to Nielsen ratings. The episode was the third most-watched episode of the season, airing in the first week of the seasonal prime time schedule. Showing a significant increase in ratings, the episode attracted approximately 2.91 more million viewers than the previous season finale, which was watched by 22.50 and garnered an 8.0 rating. "Time Has Come Today" was also the lead in weekly viewership, and, therefore, the lead in the time slot, with approximately 2.84 more million viewers than CBS's juggernaut CSI, which ranked third in weekly viewership with an 8.0 rating.

Oscar Dahl of BuddyTV had a generally mixed to positive perspective on the episode, expressing hope in its further development. Although originally criticizing the predictability of the event, Dahl noted an "undeniable sense of originality", deeming the episode a portal to the series becoming "a medical chick flick, but a damn good one". Highly praising the "big and attractive" cast, Dahl positively received the interaction between the characters, noting the "smart" dialogue that helps each character evolve. However, Dahl expressed disappointment in the over emotional scenes, describing them as "off-putting" and "not believable", while comparing them to real life interactions between people who emote in a more subtle manner than displayed on television. "Emotions ran high in the premiere and there was much crying", stated Dahl, but noted that the dialogue, who he had previously been worried would be "too cutesy", was not bothering, and rather realistic, noting how the show is "smartly written". He also described the Pompeo and Heigl's as "worthy of attention". After the episode's broadcast, Robert Rorke of the New York Post deemed Stevens "the heart and soul" of the series, due to the episode mostly focusing on the events that come to define her as a person. Rorke named her the show's heroine, and wrote that "Izzie is a welcome, calming presence, despite the devastation she experienced when she failed to save her patient and fiance Denny Duquette", considering her to have been more prominent than the title character, Grey, whose storyline received negative critiques: "She used to be the queen of the romantic dilemmas. But lately, she's been a little dopey, with that endless McDreamy soliloquies." Abigail Chao of Television Without Pity had a positive outlook on the episode. She praised the storyline of Izzie lying on the bathroom floor, describing at as "a perfect opportunity for flashbacks", which proved the strong friendship the five interns share. Montgomery's reaction to the discovery of Grey's underwear was deemed by Chao "hilarious", whereas Bailey's interaction with the quarantined patient was described as "touching". "Now it's Meredith's turn to be feckless and indecisive", stated Chao, noting the lack of realism in Grey's love triangle with Shepherd and Dandridge. However, she praised the interaction of the three characters, who she deemed "lovely adolescents".

References

External links 
"Time Has Come Today" at ABC.com
"Time Has Come Today" at IMDb.com

2006 American television episodes
Grey's Anatomy (season 3) episodes